Bridgewater is a town in Windsor County, Vermont, United States. The population was 903 at the 2020 census. Bridgewater contains the hamlets of Bridgewater Village, Bridgewater Corners, West Bridgewater, and Bridgewater Center (formerly called Briggs).

Geography
The Ottauquechee River flows west to east through the town. U.S. Route 4 follows the river, connecting Woodstock and White River Junction to the east with Rutland to the west. The Appalachian Trail passes through the town, running along the northern border.

Demographics

As of the census of 2000, there were 980 people, 395 households, and 250 families residing in the town.  The population density was 19.8 people per square mile (7.6/km2).  There were 582 housing units at an average density of 11.7 per square mile (4.5/km2).  The racial makeup of the town was 98.47% White, 0.31% Native American, 0.51% Asian, and 0.71% from two or more races. Hispanic or Latino of any race were 0.10% of the population.

There were 395 households, out of which 27.8% had children under the age of 18 living with them, 57.5% were married couples living together, 4.6% had a female householder with no husband present, and 36.5% were non-families. 27.6% of all households were made up of individuals, and 10.9% had someone living alone who was 65 years of age or older.  The average household size was 2.48 and the average family size was 3.08.

In the town, the population was spread out, with 23.1% under the age of 18, 5.6% from 18 to 24, 29.4% from 25 to 44, 28.7% from 45 to 64, and 13.3% who were 65 years of age or older.  The median age was 41 years. For every 100 females, there were 102.9 males.  For every 100 females age 18 and over, there were 102.7 males.

The median income for a household in the town was $39,107, and the median income for a family was $47,500. Males had a median income of $27,727 versus $22,857 for females. The per capita income for the town was $19,811.  About 4.9% of families and 7.9% of the population were below the poverty line, including 9.0% of those under age 18 and 11.9% of those age 65 or over.

See also

 Long Trail Brewing Company

References

 
Towns in Vermont
Towns in Windsor County, Vermont
1779 establishments in Vermont